Hermann Grab (6 May 1903 – 2 August 1949) was a Bohemian German-language writer.

Early years
Hermann was born into a wealthy aristocratic family of Jewish origin in Prague, Bohemian Kingdom (an old name of today's Czech Republic). Although his parents were formally Jewish, Hermann and his brother were educated as Catholics. Hermann studied at the German Gymnasium Na Prikopech (Prague) and then entered German Charles-Ferdinand University. Later he studied at universities in Berlin, Heidelberg and Vienna.

Life in Prague and writer work
After short juridical praxis, Grab became a music teacher and music-critic of Prager Montagsblatt. In 1934, he published the first of his short stories in Prague magazines and in 1935 his first book, Der Stadtpark, a Prague novel, for he was said to be 'Prague Proust' (Joseph Strelka).

Exile in the United States and death
After the occupation of his country by Hitler between 1938 and 1939, Grab escaped to Paris. When Hitler's armies defeated France, he escaped (and lost all his manuscripts) through France, Spain, Portugal, and finally to the USA. Hermann settled in New York City and established a small music school, married a Belgian exile and wrote his second book, Hochzeit in Brooklyn. Serious illness prevented him from returning to Prague after World War II. He died fully invalid in 1949 in New York and was buried at Flushing Cemetery in Flushing, Queens, New York City.

Works of Hermann Grab
Der Stadtpark (Town Park), novel published in Prague 1935. Prague's pre-World War I life seen by a teenager. 
Hochzeit in Brooklyn (Marriage in Brooklyn), a book of excellent short stories, written in 1940s, published posthumously in Vienna 1957. Some of them with a Prague theme, others with New York and Lisbon theme.

Secondary Literature 
 "Das neue Weihnachtsbuch. Thomas Mann über ein neues Prager Buch". In: Prager Montagsblatt 57 (1934), No.50 (10. 12. 1934), p. 8.
 Haas, Willy: "Pražský Němec 1935". [A German of Prague 1935.]  In: Literární noviny [Literary Review] 7 (1935), No. 4, p. 3.
 Mann, Klaus: "Hermann Grab, Der Stadtpark". In: Die Sammlung 2 (1935), No. 7, p. 387 – 389. 
 C. S. [d.i. Carl Seelig]: "Der Stadtpark von Hermann Grab". In: Neue Zürcher Zeitung 156 (1935), No. 770, Beilage
 Politzer, Heinz: "Hermann Grab: Der Stadtpark". In: das silberboot 1 (1935/1936), fasc. 1, p. 46 – 47. 
 Strelka, Joseph P.: "Ein österreichischer Proust". In: Strelka: Brücke zu vielen Ufern. Wien, Frankfurt, Zürich 1966, p. 119.  
 Härtling, Peter: "Hermann Grab: Der Stadtpark". In: Härtling: Vergessene Bücher. Stuttgart 1966, p. 143 – 150. (2nd ed. Munich 1986, p. 197 – 205.)
 Becher, Peter: "Schreiben am Abgrund. Hermann Grab – ein Erzähler aus dem Prager Kreis". In: Süddeutsche Zeitung 41 (1985), Nr. 117 (22. 5. 1985), S. 13.
 Bonsen, Peter: "Zweifelhaftes Glück. Der Exilautor Hermann Grab – eine Wiederentdeckung". In: Rhein-Neckar-Zeitung. Heidelberger Nachrichten 41 (1985), No. 183. 
 Weinzierl, Ulrich: "Der kunstvoll gedämpfte Schrecken". In: Frankfurter Allgemeine Zeitung 1985, No. 98 (27. 4. 1985). Beilage Bilder und Zeiten – Literatur, p. 5.
 Unger, Karl: "Planvoll beschädigte Novellen. Der Stadtpark, Erzählungen von Hermann Grab". In: Deutsche Volkszeitung 1985, Nr.31 (2. 8. 1985), S. 12. 
 Adler, Jeremy: "Hermann Grab: Der Stadtpark". In: Times Literary Supplement 84 (1985), No. 4306 (11. 10. 1985), p. 1146.
 Adler, H. G.:  Der Stadtpark und andere Erzählungen. In: Literatur und Kritik 21 (1986), fasc. 205 – 206, p. 273 – 275. 
 Theodor W. Adorno: "Hermann Grab". In: Theodor Adorno, Gesammelte Schriften, Suhrkamp, Frankfurt/M.
 Theodor Adorno: Vermischte Schriften, 1986,   S. 465 f.
 Karl Hobi: Hermann Grab. Leben und Werk, PhD Thesis, Fribourg (Switzerland) 1969.
 Ernst Schönwiese: "Hermann Grab" In: Wort in der Zeit 4 (1958), S. 257 ff.
 Handbuch österreichischer Autorinnen und Autoren jüdischer Herkunft 18. bis 20. Jahrhundert. Band 1. Hrsg. Österreichische Nationalbibliothek, Wien. Redaktion: Susanne Blumesberger. Saur, München 2002, S. 452, .
 Lucy Topol’ská: Hermann Grab. Biographie

References

Czechoslovak short story writers
Writers from Prague
Jewish Czech writers
Burials at Flushing Cemetery
1903 births
1949 deaths
Czechoslovak novelists
Czechoslovak emigrants to the United States